John Vilhelmsen (also known as Wilhelmsen; born 12 October 1934) is a Danish coxswain. He competed at the 1952 Summer Olympics in Helsinki with the men's eight where they were eliminated in the semi-final repêchage.

References

1934 births
Living people
Danish male rowers
Olympic rowers of Denmark
Rowers at the 1952 Summer Olympics
Rowers at the 1956 Summer Olympics
Rowers from Copenhagen
Coxswains (rowing)
European Rowing Championships medalists